Lee Seok-hoon (born June 6, 1972) is a South Korean film director and screenwriter. Lee began his directorial debut with the high school comedy See You After School (2006), followed by romantic comedy Two Faces of My Girlfriend (2007) - both films starring Bong Tae-gyu as the leading role. His romantic comedy Dancing Queen (2012) was a commercial success with over four million admissions and the period adventure film The Pirates (2014), starring Son Ye-jin and Kim Nam-gil, was also a hit with more than 8.6 million admissions at the end of its run.

Filmography 
Saturday 2.00 pm (1998) - assistant director
Zzang (1998) - directing dept
White Valentine (1999) - directing dept
For the Peace of All Mankind (short film, 1999) - director, screenwriter
Super Glue (short film, 2001) - director, screenwriter, editor 
See You After School (2006) - director, screenwriter
Two Faces of My Girlfriend (2007) - director
Dancing Queen (2012) - director, screenwriter
Rockin' on Heaven's Door (2013) - script editor
The Pirates (2014) - director
The Himalayas (2015) - director
Confidential Assignment 2: International (2022) - director

Awards 
2014 22nd Korea Culture and Entertainment Awards: Best Director (The Pirates)

References

External links 
 
 
 

1972 births
Living people
South Korean film directors
South Korean screenwriters